Cerithiopsis blandi is a species of sea snail, a gastropod in the family Cerithiopsidae, which is known from around Madagascar. It was described by Deshayes in Vignal, in 1900.

References

 Lamy, Ed., 1909. Diagnoses de coquilles nouvelles recueillies par M. F. Geay à Madagascar (1905). Bulletin du Muséum national d'Histoire naturelle 15: 368-370

External links
 Syntype in MNHN, Paris

blandi
Gastropods described in 1900